Calyptra subnubila is a moth of the  family Erebidae. It has been found in Indonesia.

References

Calpinae
Moths described in 1928